Zlatica or Zlatitsa may refer to:
 Zlatica (river), or Aranca, a river of Romania and Serbia
 , a river in Bulgaria, discharging into the Ogosta Reservoir
 Zlatitsa, a town in Bulgaria
 Zlatica, Podgorica, a suburb of Podgorica, Montenegro
 Stadion Zlatica, a football stadium
 Zlatița, a village in Romania
 Zlatica Mijatović (born 1922), Serbian gymnast

Stadion Zlatica, a football stadium in Montenegro

See also